Stigmella ostryaefoliella is a moth of the family Nepticulidae. It is found in North America in Ohio, New Jersey, New York, Florida and Ontario.

There are two generations per year.

The larvae feed on a wide range of plants, including Carya (including Carya ovata), Ostrya and Carpinus. They mine the leaves of their host plant.

External links
A taxonomic revision of the North American species of Stigmella (Lepidoptera: Nepticulidae)

Nepticulidae
Moths of North America
Moths described in 1861